William "Bill" Donohue Pluecker is an American businessman, politician, and farmer serving as a member of the Maine House of Representatives from the 95th district. Elected in November 2018, he assumed office on December 5, 2018.

Education 
Pluecker earned a Bachelor of Arts degree from Pitzer College in 1999.

Career 
Pluecker is the co-owner of Hatchet Cove Farm, which he founded in 2004. He also teaches courses on marketing and small business development in the agricultural sector. He was elected to the Maine House of Representatives in November 2018 and assumed office on December 5, 2018. Pluecker is an independent.

Personal life 
Pluecker lives in Warren, Maine with his wife, Reba Richardson, and two children. He is a member of the First Universalist Church in Rockland, a member congregation of the Unitarian Universalist Association.

References 

Year of birth missing (living people)
Living people
Maine Independents
Members of the Maine House of Representatives
People from Warren, Maine
Pitzer College alumni
American Universalists
Farmers from Maine
Businesspeople from Maine